The 32nd Trampoline Gymnastics World Championships were held in Sofia, Bulgaria, from November 9–12, 2017.

Medal table

Results

References

External links
 Official website
 FIG site

World Trampoline Championships
2017
Sports competitions in Sofia
International gymnastics competitions hosted by Bulgaria
2017 in Bulgarian sport
Trampoline World Championships